The 33rd "Caracal" Battalion is an infantry combat battalion of the Israel Defense Forces, one of the three fully combat units (alongside the 'Lions of Jordan Battalion' and the 'Cheetah Battalion') in the Israeli military's Paran Brigade that are composed of both male and female soldiers. It is named after the caracal, a small cat whose sexes appear the same. , approximately 70% of the battalion was female.

History

Prior to Caracal's formation in 2000, women were barred from serving in direct combat. The unit has since been tasked with patrolling the Israeli-Egyptian border. It took part in Israel's unilateral withdrawal from the Gaza Strip in the summer of 2005.

Caracal Battalion engaged in combat on September 21, 2012 on the Egyptian border, following the infiltration of a group of terrorists. Responding to a radio report of the attack, in a fire-fight a female Caracal infantry soldier killed a terrorist, who was wearing a Suicide Belt.

In October 2014, a jeep of the battalion was attacked by militants from the Egyptian border with gunfire and an anti-tank missile. Two soldiers were injured. One of the injured, a female officer, Captain Or Ben-Yehuda, nonetheless dismounted from the jeep and returned fire killing one militant in the fire-fight.

In November 2017, Caracal officially became part of the border array (alongside the 'Lions of Jordan Battalion' and the 'Cheetah Battalion') and replaced the green beret with a light yellow and brown camouflage.

While Caracal is a mixed gender battalion, it has been 70% female since 2009. It is part of the 512th Sagi Brigade of the Southern Command. The unit badge incorporates the Sagi Brigade badge with the addition of the caracal cat.

Training

Members of the Caracal Battalion were formerly issued the Israeli-made Tavor assault rifle. but are now issued M4 carbines or M16 rifles.

Battalion members partake in a four-month basic training period that includes physical training and weapons training at the Givati Brigade training base.

Notable recruits
Second Lieutenant Noy, who is serving in the Caracal Battalion, was the first female officer to command a sniper platoon.

Elinor Joseph, who has also served with the Caracal Battalion, is the first Arab woman ever to serve in a combat role in the Israeli Army.

Captain Or Ben-Yehuda was awarded a citation while serving in the Caracal Battalion. Ben-Yehuda was in charge of the Caracal Battalion which was stationed near the Israeli-Egyptian border. Nearly two dozen armed men opened fire on their position in an ambush attack on October 22, 2014. Although wounded in the volley of gunfire, Ben-Yehuda managed to get on the radio and call for backup, administer first aid to her driver and return several magazines worth of gunfire back at her attackers while waiting for reinforcements.

See also

 Gender-blindness
 Gender equality
 Women in the Israel Defense Forces
 Lionesses for National Defence - Syrian female combat roles

References

Battalions of Israel
Military units and formations established in 2000
Southern Command (Israel)
Women in 21st-century warfare
Infantry of Israel
Women in the Israeli military